FRED was a disk-based magazine for the SAM Coupé brand of computer. It was owned and run by Colin Macdonald during the 1990s and lasted for 82 issues.

References

External links
 FRED Archive indexed with content information, screenshots and download links.

Defunct computer magazines published in the United Kingdom
Disk magazines
Home computer magazines
Magazines with year of disestablishment missing
Magazines with year of establishment missing